is a railway station in the Shin-Koiwa neighborhood, in Katsushika, Tokyo, Japan, operated by East Japan Railway Company (JR East).

Lines
Shin-Koiwa Station is served by the Sōbu Line (Rapid) and the Chūō-Sōbu Line.

Station layout
The station consists of two island platforms serving four tracks. The station has a "Midori no Madoguchi" staffed ticket office and also a "View Plaza" travel agent.

Platforms

History
Shin-Koiwa Station opened on 10 July 1928. With the privatization of Japanese National Railways (JNR) on 1 April 1987, the station came under the control of JR East.

Passenger statistics
In fiscal 2013, the station was used by an average of 72,306 passengers daily (boarding passengers only), making it the 59th-busiest station operated by JR East. The daily average passenger figures (boarding passengers only) in previous years are as shown below.

Accidents
JR East is considering installing platform-edge doors due to the large number of passenger accidents and suicides occurring at this station. Between July 2011 and June 2013, 13 incidents occurred in which passengers were hit by trains at this station. Katsushika Ward made an official request to JR East to install platform-edge doors at the station in July 2012.

On 27 June 2013, at around 14:40, a man in his thirties jumped in front of a 12-car Narita Express Yokohama to Narita Airport service passing non-stop through the station. The man died and his body hit a woman standing on the platform, injuring her.

See also
 List of railway stations in Japan

References

External links

 JR East station information 

Railway stations in Tokyo
Railway stations in Japan opened in 1928